The 1986–87 Hong Kong First Division League season was the 76th since its establishment. It was the first season where only players with permanent residency were allowed to register.

League table

References
1986–87 Hong Kong First Division table (RSSSF)

Hong
Hong Kong First Division League seasons
1986–87 in Hong Kong football